Denmark has two official national anthems with equal status: 
Der er et yndigt land, the civil national anthem.
Kong Christian stod ved højen mast, which is mainly used for royal and military occasions.

References

National symbols of Denmark